Aikhylu Chasma is a tectonic rift valley on Venus, and the landing site of the Venera 9 lander. It is located in Beta Regio.

References

Surface features of Venus